Heera Group UK is a bhangra music band that originated in the early 1980s. Founded by Satwant Singh Taak, London- composer and musician. Here’s was Also known as the pioneers of British Bhangra, and one of the most successful British Bhangra bands in history. the lead singers are Palvinder Dhami and Jasvinder Kumar (known as Dhami and Kumar)both from India who later. 
Jagawala Mela - was the first album and was arguably the best as it is the most authentically Bhangra. The later albums were more indfused with synth pop sound.

History
Known as the pioneers of British Bhangra, Heera Group was founded in 1979. The group initially formed under Quallander group which comprised various members but later the Duo Jasvinder Kumar and Palvinder Dhami popularly known as Kumar and Dhami together with Deepak Kazhanchi attempted to continue the band’s former success but failed. 

Heera were the first British Bhangra band who infused traditional Punjabi lyrics with western instruments to appeal to the emergence of the new era of British Asians. 

Heera broke records with their songs such as Dowain Jaaniya, Sus Kutni, Maar chadapa to name a few.

Heera toured worldwide bringing British Bhangra to the forefront. Notably ghazal pioneer Jagjit Singh brought Heera to Delhi and arranged a sell out concert. Actor Dharmendra also had Heera for his sons Bobby Deol’s marriage. 

Heera were the first band to appear on mainstream British tv, notably Blue Peter. 

The band were known for their high energetic performances and uplifting songs. 

Their later works included acting and singing in the film Shaheed Udham Singh starring Raj Babber. 

Recently Heera released a song in support of the farmers protest in Punjab India - Jit pakki saddi hai.

Career
With Charnjit Ahuja's music they released the album 'Bhabi Te Nanaan Nachdi' (1983). Jag wala mela saw them collaborate with legendary kuldeep bhamrah. Their iconic albums such as Diamonds from Heera and Cool & Deadley with Deepak Khazanchi as music director paved Heeras unique sound that they are known for. Later on J. Kumar also went sing “Teri Meri Ek Jind" in Bollywood. Palvinder Dhami became a solo singer in the Punjabi folk industry and acted in many movies. The duo continues to perform worldwide and have a recording studio in London used to promote new talent .

Albums
Bhabhi te Nanaan Nachdi
 Diamonds from Heera
 Bhangra Fever Vol 1
 Rabba Ki Kariye
 Beyond Control
 Jagh Wala Mela
 Yaaran Di Yaari
 Cool & Deadly
 Kohinoor
 Back to Desi
 Alaap & Heera Group Vol - 1
 Alaap & Heera Group Vol - 2
 Shaheed Udham Singh - Boli kich ke 
 Legends Boliyan - GV
 PBN - Lak Hilda 
 Jit Pakki saddi hai

Awards
In 2008 the group was awarded a "Lifetime Achievement" award at the UK Asian Music Awards.

References

External links
 Bhangra Singer Profiles

British world music groups
Bhangra (music) musical groups
Musical groups established in 1981